West China Hospital COVID-19 vaccine is a COVID-19 vaccine candidate developed by Jiangsu Province Centers for Disease Control and Prevention, West China Hospital and Sichuan University.


Clinical trials 
In August 2020, WestVac Biopharma started phase I clinical trials with 168 participants in China.

In November, WestVac Biopharma started phase II clinical trials with 960 participants in China In February 2021, WestVac Biopharma started phase IIb clinical trials with 4,000 participants in China. Later, WestVac Biopharma is no longer on phase IIb clinical trial.

In June 2021, WestVac Biopharma started phase III trials with 40,000 participants including Indonesia, Kenya, and the Philippines.

Children and adolescents trials 
In August 2021 WestVac Biopharma started phase I/II trials with 600 participants for children and adolescents aged 6-17.

References 

Clinical trials
Chinese COVID-19 vaccines
Science and technology in China
Protein subunit vaccines